

Albert Wodrig (16 July 1883  – 31 October 1972) was a German general during World War II who commanded the XXVI Army Corps, which was initially briefly his namesake ("Corps Wodrig"). He was a recipient of the Knight's Cross of the Iron Cross of Nazi Germany.

Awards and decorations

 Knight's Cross of the Iron Cross on  19 July 1940 as General der Artillerie and commander of XXVI. Armeekorps

References

Citations

Bibliography

 

1883 births
1972 deaths
Military personnel from Berlin
German Army generals of World War II
Generals of Artillery (Wehrmacht)
German Army personnel of World War I
Recipients of the clasp to the Iron Cross, 1st class
Recipients of the Gold German Cross
Recipients of the Knight's Cross of the Iron Cross
Recipients of the Order of the Cross of Liberty, 1st Class
Prussian Army personnel
People from the Province of Brandenburg
Major generals of the Reichswehr